Sad clown paradox is the contradictory association between comedy and mental disorders such as depression and anxiety. These comedic performers are characterised by feelings of deprivation and isolation in their early lives, where comedy evolves as a release for tension, removing feelings of suppressed physical rage through a verbal outlet.

A series of psychological experiments first published in 1981 by psychologist Seymour Fisher indicated certain behavioural traits exclusive to comedians and not matched in regular actors. Later work conducted by Kaufman and Kozbelt re-interpreted these results, drawing the understanding that whilst comedy serves as a coping mechanism to hide trauma, it may also motivate a comedian to use humour as a way of forming relations and gaining acceptance.

Humour has been shown to develop from a young age, fostered by parental behaviour. A parent's immature nature can lead to additional responsibilities forced onto children, which can evoke issues of self-worth and a need for acceptance. The constant search for approval may cause mental health issues such as anxiety or depression and when untreated can lead to suicide in extreme situations. Laughter can evolve as a medium for self-preservation, detaching the individual from any adversity faced allowing for perceived control over uncomfortable situations.

Sad clown paradox is characterised by a cyclothymic temperament, which encourages the creation of light-hearted humour in a professional setting, despite inner turmoil. The use of humour as a form of self-medication provides short periods of satisfaction, repeatedly needing to deal with inner turmoil. There is an ever present anxiety amongst comedians that their popularity may disappear tomorrow and hence are driven to exhaustion in their work.



Influences

School experiences 
Comedic performers frequently show humorous tendencies early in life, often identified as the 'class clown' throughout school. Comics recalled mocking the strict nature of school, taking great pleasure in the laughter from their peers. Tommy Smothers commented that during his schooling experiences;"I got a big kick out of them laughing, but I didn’t know what it was that made them laugh, but I knew I could make people laugh." Johnny Carson also emphasised the role of school in a comedian’s life stating that:

Despite comedians often being of high intelligence, the school environment was detested and frequently avoided. Comics explained that their teachers lacked understanding and acceptance, identifying their mannerisms as a form of personal exclusion. Woody Allen commented that school "was boring, frightening. The whole thing was ugly. I never had the answers. I never did the homework." Even though a school’s orientation to order and discipline conflicts with the nature of a comic, it can serve as an initial arena for an individual to realise their ability to produce laughter. This discovery creates mixed feelings as frequently the laughter can be directed at themselves with undertones of ridicule or mockery. Regardless of the unpleasantness involved, comics are attracted to the ability of 'making' someone laugh and the power it holds.

The talent for creating humour directs the individual towards a career in the entertainment industry. It was found that comedians did not directly enter the industry as comics; rather, a large proportion began through some form of musical performance. Fisher believed this trend among comedians to have a musical background was derived from their pursuit of creating a more cheerful, welcoming world for the audience.

Family relations 

Relationships formed with family members are key in adolescent development, particularly for future satisfaction with life.  Studies have shown that comedic performers tend to be raised in distant, somewhat disjointed family settings, characterised by family animosity. Prasinos and Tittler interpreted that this 'family distance' caused individuals to identify as victims of neglect and hence associate as an alienated group. Sad clown paradox can evolve from these incohesive environments from a young age, where a child desires social contact, using humour to obtain intimacy and somewhat relate to others from a distance. Norman Lear commented on his painful childhood due to the constant conflict from his parents stating that; "the only defence against that was to laugh at it, find out what was funny in it."

A study conducted by Fisher found humour-orientated individuals likely to identify their mothers as demanding, unsympathetic and distant.  They were seen as avoiding the nurturant role, commonly falling on the father to fulfil this role for the family. An inkblot test for parents of comedians revealed their tendency toward a childlike view of the world, describing protocols with juvenile imagery. Fisher concluded that these views were linked with a parent's reluctance towards responsibilities, associated with a general tone that "happiness prevails.” Parents of comics were found to avoid solemn ideas, identifying negative images in Rorschach tests and then denying their negative elements, such as: "this is a wolf. I thought it was ferocious. But I heard that it is not." This childlike view of the world and rejection of family obligations can cause comedians to embody a greater sense of responsibility and a feeling of obligation to protect others, a compensation for their parents’ unconscious rejection of adult responsibilities. This burden of responsibilities has been shown to evoke issues regarding self-worth that foster the development of the sad clown paradox.

It has also been suggested that humour may serve as an attempt to relate to people from a distance, evoked by a childhood desire for social contact. Typically humour is described as an emotional and cognitive state and its absence has been found to cause depression and anxiety.

Comedians have been found to recognize the importance of a competent caregiver, and are often worried about being inadequate parents or caregivers themselves.  A study conducted by Samuel Janus revealed that  the sampled comedic performers were more prone to wanting larger families. This was associated with a comic's need to provide and form connections that can be fulfilled in a family setting.

Social context 

The early lives of comedians are characterised by suffering, isolation and feelings of deprivation, where humour is used as an outlet or defence against experienced anxiety.  German philosopher Nietzsche once described it as; "man alone suffers so excruciatingly in the world that he was compelled to invent laughter."  The inability to exhibit direct aggression results in expression through the socially acceptable manner of humour. 

Humour provides the ability to assert control and invincibility in a situation. An example is the British comedian Spike Milligan, who suffered from a long cycle of manic-depressive states that were onset by severe mental breakdowns. Milligan was capable of creating light-hearted humour and outrageous ideas, despite his manic state. Finding laughter served as motivation to remedy a depressed mental state and effectively function as self-medication. This process has been described as a safeguard against the formation of hopelessness and subsequent depression. Additionally, affiliative and self-enhancing humour can be used to predict symptoms of depression, with higher levels shown to correlate with lower levels of depression.

Recounts from psychiatric treatments revealed some patients to be overwhelmed by negative aspects of their life. However, when these issues were confronted the psychiatrist was met with laughter, followed by the patient dismissing the severity of the issue. The laughter can hide feelings of frustration, disappointment, grief, remorse or even joy in an effort to defend against adversity and allow for self preservation.

Scientific studies

Rorschach test 
The use of inkblot imaging reveals certain characteristics and worries of comedic performers that are not matched in regular actors. Fisher identified four key trends that were common for comedians' Rorschach Tests;

 The identification of 'not-bad' imagery. This involves a traditional, negative idea that has been misunderstood and is a victim to preconceived views. Would include responses such as "Two devils. Funny devils. Not to be taken seriously." or "Pig-like .... Ugly but yet somewhat endearing."
 Comedian's association with ideas of purity vs evil leads to identification of things bearing moral importance. Fisher concluded this significance was due to comedians need to mock societal standards and hence blur the line between good and bad.
Importance of scale. Describing objects with reference to their magnitude. This disparity in size serves as a reliable source of humour. Charlie Chaplin utilised an iconic costume of large baggy pants, a small bowler hat, enormous shoes and his small moustache. Comedic duos such as Abbott and Costello or Laurel and Hardy played off their height and weight differences for comedic effect.
 Importance of up versus down, with more concern placed on who or what is down. The use of up-down imagery was frequently implemented by Buster Keaton where his characters were seen falling from great heights or hanging from balconies. A recurring message of failure was linked to the looming threat of falling, negated by a last minute escape and triumph.

Fisher suggested that these traits are directly linked to the comics perception of self, believing a need to convince others of their value. Comedians were commonly shown to not hold themselves in high regard, providing more self-depreciating remarks than regular actors in a controlled context. These feelings of unworthiness are defended against in the comic's mind by their role in society of helping people and providing laughter. This intent to help people is only momentarily satisfied by audience recognition and approval.This is contrasted against regular actors who were seen to find validation in identifying with figures and concepts larger than themselves.

Aptitude/personality tests 

A study conducted by Janus found comedians worked to exhaustion to ensure they remained relevant and funny. He found that from his sample of comedic performers, eighty percent have been involved in psychotherapy and feared its effect on their ability for humour. Comedians were shown to be critical towards the motives of others and feared the longevity of their popularity as celebrities.  Most participants from Janus’ study revealed an inescapable sense of depression which they faced alongside their work. The manner in which comedy momentarily alleviates their depression and anxiety allows them to function. However, comedians function for short periods of time, constantly requiring admiration and acknowledgement for their work.

Comedians have also been shown to display high levels of psychotic personality traits, scoring high in introvertive anhedonia and impulsive non-conformity. The instability between depressive traits and more extroverted, manic states is traditionally described as cyclothymic temperament. British comedian Stephen Fry confessed to the common mental state he experiences when performing; "there are times when I'm doing QI and I'm going 'ha ha, yeah, yeah', and inside I'm going 'I want to fucking die. I... want... to... fucking... die.'"
Fry's comments indicate the idea of manic defence, where opposite emotions are used to distract and cope with uncomfortable feelings.

Pagliacci joke 
A joke dating from at least the 19th century exemplifies the sad clown paradox. The joke involves a doctor recommending his depressed patient to visit a great clown in town (typically named "Pagliacci"), but it turns out that the patient is actually the clown out of costume.

An 1814 book on public speaking attributes the story to Carlina, "a droll buffoon of the Italian stage at Paris". The joke also appears in the Spanish poem Reír Llorando (Laughing While Crying) by the late 19th century Mexican poet Juan de Dios Peza. The poem tells of an English actor called 'Garrick' that a doctor recommends to his patient as the only cure for his loss of interest in life, whereupon the patient reveals that he indeed is Garrick. It has been suggested that this Garrick was the entertainer Joseph Grimaldi. The joke also appears in the closing lines of Ralph Waldo Emerson's essay, "The Comic," collected in Letters and Social Aims (1875); Emerson's comedian is named Carlini.

The poem was then seen as a story in the 1910s, again, with the performer called 'Grimaldi', and again from the 1930s, featuring a clown called 'Grock', suggested as being the Swiss clown Charles Adrien Wettach.

The 1987 graphic novel Watchmen includes the character of Rorschach telling the story and naming the clown as Pagliacci.

See also 

 List of people with an anxiety disorder
 Creativity and mental illness
 Wise fool

References

Sources 
 
 
 
 
 
 
 
 
 
 
 
 
 
 
 

Psychological concepts
Mental health
Comedy
Humour
Paradoxes